Erica versicolor is a species of flowering plant in the family Ericaceae, native to South Africa’s Cape Province.

In cultivation E. versicolor requires well-drained acidic soil and a sheltered situation in full sun. It cannot tolerate freezing temperatures. In the UK it has gained the Royal Horticultural Society’s Award of Garden Merit.

Description
The flowers have a two-tone appearance, predominantly red with green or yellow tips (hence the Latin specific epithet versicolor), and bloom from October until April. The leaves are trifoliate, smooth, and a deep green. The branches of the plant are nearly simple.

Gallery

References

versicolor
Flora of the Cape Provinces
Taxa named by Henry Cranke Andrews